Pampas is a rural locality in the Toowoomba Region, Queensland, Australia.

Geography 
The locality is positioned between the main channel and north branch of the Condamine River both of which mark boundaries. The Millmerran railway line and Gore Highway pass through Pampas. The Pampas–Horrane Road (State Route 82) runs north-west to Cecil Plains.

The land use is predominantly horticulture and cropping.

History
Pampas is named because of the extensive coverage of kangaroo grass.

Pampas railway station is an abandoned railway station on the Millmerran railway line.

The Dry Paddock Provisional School opened on 9 August 1897. In 1909 it became Pampas State School. It closed on 27 December 1957. It was at 22 Fysh Road.

Pampas Memorial Hall was erected in late 1954.

Economy 
There are a number of homesteads in the locality, including:

 Bonnie Doon
 Culverthorpe
 Ebrose
 Erindale
 Kyle
 Miraba
 Wictown

Education 
There are no schools in Pampas. The nearest government primary school is Brookstead State School in neighbouring Brookstead to the north-east. The nearest government secondary schools are Millmerran State School (to Year 10) in Millmerran to the south-west and Pittsworth State High School in Pittsworth to the north-east.

Amenities 
Pampas Memorial Hall is at 6179 Gore Highway.

References

Further reading

External links

Suburbs of Toowoomba
Localities in Queensland